The Bishop of Coventry is the ordinary of the Church of England Diocese of Coventry in the Province of Canterbury. In the Middle Ages, the Bishop of Coventry was a title used by the bishops known today as the Bishop of Lichfield. 

The present diocese covers most of the County of Warwickshire. The see is in the City of Coventry where the bishop's seat is located at the Cathedral Church of Saint Michael. The Bishop's residence is Bishop's House, Coventry.

History

From 1102 to 1238, the former Benedictine Priory and Cathedral of St Mary in the city was the seat of the early Bishops of Coventry (previously known as Bishops of Chester or of Lichfield). It was, afterwards, one of the two seats of the Bishop of Coventry and Lichfield until the Reformation of the 1530s when Coventry (St Mary's) Cathedral was demolished and the bishop's seat moved to Lichfield, though the title remained as Bishop of Lichfield and Coventry until 1837, when Coventry was united with the Diocese of Worcester.

Bishops of the modern diocese
The diocese was revived in 1918 under King George V when the parish church of Saint Michael was elevated to cathedral status. The cathedral suffered under fire-bombing by the Luftwaffe on the night of 14 November 1940 and remains today as a dignified ruin adjacent to the new cathedral building consecrated on 25 May 1962. The 8th Bishop of Coventry was Colin Bennetts, who retired on 31 January 2008.

Christopher Cocksworth was ordained and consecrated as the 9th Bishop of Coventry on 3 July 2008 at Southwark Cathedral. He was enthroned and received into the diocese during a service at Coventry Cathedral on 1 November 2008. Cocksworth was previously Principal of Ridley Hall, part of the Cambridge Federation of Theological Colleges.

Assistant bishops
Among those who have served as assistant bishops of the diocese have been:
1937–1952: Richard Heywood, retired Bishop of Mombasa
1952–1959: Nathaniel Newnham Davis, Rector of Ladbroke and former Bishop of Antigua
1960–1980: John McKie, Rector of Berkswell (until 1966), Vicar of Great and Little Packington (from 1966) and former Bishop of Geelong
1968–1975 (ret.): John Daly, Priest-in-charge of Honington with Idlicote and Whatcote (until 1970), Vicar of Bishop's Tachbrook thereafter; former Bishop of Gambia and the Rio Pongas, of Accra, in Korea and of Taejon

References

Bibliography

External links
 Crockford's Clerical Directory: Historical successions

 
Coventry
Bishops of Coventry
Diocese of Coventry